Union Township is one of eighteen townships in Appanoose County, Iowa, United States. As of the 2010 census, its population was 157.

History
Union Township was founded in 1848.

Geography
According to the USGS, it contains three cemeteries: Albany, Knapp and Sales.

References

External links
 US-Counties.com
 City-Data.com

Townships in Appanoose County, Iowa
Townships in Iowa
1848 establishments in Iowa
Populated places established in 1848